John Ned Mendelsohn is an American writer, journalist, musician and graphic designer.

Biography
Mendelsohn, who since 1979 has spelled his surname with two s's, was born in Washington but moved with his parents to southern California aged six months. He lived briefly in the San Fernando Valley, but mostly on the coast, first in Playa del Rey, and later above Pacific Coast Highway just south of Topanga Canyon Boulevard. He studied sociology at the University of California, Los Angeles, and was exempted from military service on the basis of psychological infirmity.

Mendelsohn began contributing music criticism to the Los Angeles Times and Rolling Stone while still a student. Although he was an ardent champion of the Kinks and The Who, the best known of his early contributions are his unfavorable reviews of the first two Led Zeppelin albums, which were published in Rolling Stone in 1969. Mendelsohn cited the British critic Nik Cohn as a major influence on his own writing, admitting that "my own star began to rise very quickly after I perfected my imitation of him".

While continuing to write album reviews, Mendelsohn formally launched his own music career in the early 1970s. Together with bass player Ralph William Oswald, with whom he'd played in a succession of ragtag college groups (including recording a demo album with a nascent Sparks), he formed a serious version of their group Christopher Milk in mid-1970. With Mendelsohn primarily serving as lyricist and, ill-advisedly, lead singer. The group recorded for United Artists and Warner Bros. Records before disbanding in 1973. As a musician and composer, Mendelsohn released an EP on Greg Shaw's Bomp label, titled John Mendelsohn's the Pits, in 1975. Rhino released a package comprising his authorized autobiography, I, Caramba, and a compilation of song demos, Masturpieces, in 1995.

Between stints with Rolling Stone, Mendelsohn contributed to Creem in the mid-1980s; later, he wrote for Playboy, Wired and Mojo. He worked in graphic design and website design from the late 1990s through the time of this biography's composition.

In 2002, Mendelsohn relocated to the United Kingdom to reside there with his English second wife, Claire, and promptly composed and produced his solo album Sex With Twinge, and Mistress Chloe's much-praised Like a Moth to Its Flame. Over the course of the next half-decade, he composed and produced albums for Sadie Sings and Do Re Mi Fa (Cough) and published three books (Dominatrix: The Making of Mistress Chloe, Waiting for Kate Bush, and Gigantic: The Pixies and Frank Black), in addition to producing a bllizzard of unpublished fiction and several unproduced teleplays. He directed and starred in two scripted sketch comedy revues, The Ministry of Humour and Clear & Present Rangers and wrote and performed a one-man show based nn his experiences as en employee of Larry Flynt Publications, 'Wm. Floggin' Buckley', 

Mendelsohn departed the UK in late 2007 and spent 10 months in the Midwest before buying a home in New York's Hudson Valley, where, between November 2008 and November 2009, he composed, performed, and recorded a second solo album, Sorry We're Open, released in February 2010. Now living back in London after two years in Los Angeles, Mendelsohn wrote a much-ignored blog, "Mendel Illness", in which he shared his thoughts on various elements of pop culture, shared often spurious personal anecdotes, including frank accounts of his lifelong struggles with low self-esteem and depression, and satirically purported to have embraced the conservatism of Sarah Palin.

Between 2015 and 2020, he led the SW London-based band The Freudian Sluts, and composed and recorded several albums, including The Stonking Novels, The World Is Full of Beauty and of Horror (by Isambard Jones & His Orchestra), Meet the Internettes, and a country album credited to Johnny New Mendelssohn & The Clean Hankies. In 2021, he composed and recorded a new 10-song album every month from January through September, but no one paid much attention.

References

External links
For All in Tents and Porpoises (blog)
official site

Living people
American music journalists
American rock drummers
Year of birth missing (living people)